Cleanfeed is a spam filter for use with Usenet news groups. As well as blocking spam, it is also able to block binary image posts in non-binary news groups and HTML posts. It acts by looking for repeated patterns and duplicate messages, and is able to identify known spamming sites and domains. It is published under the Artistic License.

Cleanfeed was originally developed and maintained by Jeremy Nixon and later by Marco d'Itri, with the last formal update being released on 5th Aug 2001.  A beta release was made available on 1 May 2002 and is the recommended version to deploy. In 2007 Steve Crook began producing a series of updates, initially designed to counter Hipcrime floods.  Later releases include a number of new features and patches. He later developed PyClean, a python equivalent to Cleanfeed.

References 

Anti-spam
Usenet